Doukouria  is a village and rural commune of the Cercle of Goudam in the Tombouctou Region of Mali.

References

External links
.

Communes of Tombouctou Region